The following is a list of Major League Baseball players, retired or active. As of the end of the 2011 season, there have been 307 players with a last name that begins with N who have been on a major league roster at some point.

N

References

External links
Last Names starting with N – Baseball-Reference.com

 N